The Malacañang Chief of Staff, named after Malacañang Palace, the official residence of the president of the Philippines, also referred to as the "presidential chief of staff," was an official position under the Office of the President of the Philippines. President Joseph Estrada created the position in February 16, 2000, but described it as only being a "temporary" position. However, this position was carried over to the administration of his successor, President Gloria Macapagal Arroyo, before being abolished in February 26, 2008.

Powers and functions
Under the Administration of Presidents Estrada and Arroyo, the Office of the Presidential Chief of Staff held the schedule of the President in coordination with the Cabinet officer for presidential engagements, as well as supervise the President's activities and engagements. The chief of staff post also "controlled access to the President," and "provide good, wise, and honest counsel" to the country's top leader, based on AO No. 138, series of 2006. Aside from these, the Palace chief of staff reviews the documents intended for the President, advocates for their strategic policies and programs, and builds bridges with "critical stakeholders" that include the Cabinet, judiciary, and lobbyists. 
The official also guard[s] the President’s interests and Protect the President from forces that could destroy the Administration.

List

Other chiefs of staff 
Other political positions have chiefs of staff, the vice president's office under Leni Robredo and Sara Duterte.

References

Philippines
Office of the President of the Philippines
2000 establishments in the Philippines
2008 disestablishments in the Philippines